The Other Side is the second album by hip-hop duo The Outhere Brothers, released in 1998.

Track listing
"I Got Soul"
"La De Da De Da De (We Like to Party)"
"Ae-Ah"
"Mami Te Quiero"
"Ole Ole (Let Me Hear U Say)"
"Represent"
"Bow Wow Wow"
"Oh Yeah"
"Na Na Na Na (Chocolate City)"
"Get Energized"
"The Dog in Me"
"Bitch and a Ho"
"The Real Shit"
"Booty Call"
"Players"
"I'm Not the Man for You"
"Dreams"
"Whatchagonnado"

1998 albums
The Outhere Brothers albums